Vega Conflict is an online multiplayer game developed by Kixeye.

Gameplay 
Vega Conflict is an online MMORTS set in space. The player can choose to fight NPC or real players to gain resources and blueprints. The XP is used to rank up on the leader board. The game includes a variety of classes, such as frigates, corvettes, cruisers, destroyers, battleships, cutters, specialists, fighters, titans, rangers and debuffers. The fighters, titans, rangers is are only available Tier 8 or later. Twelve tiers of factions are in the game, each with their different ship classes. Galaxies are the dividing blocks in Vega Conflict since fleets are unable to warp between them. However, the outpost can be relocated between galaxies every twenty-four hours (or 1 day). Some events will periodically occur in which players can participate for prizes.

References

External links 

2013 video games
Android (operating system) games
Massively multiplayer online real-time strategy games
Science fiction video games
Windows games
IOS games
Multiplayer video games
Video games developed in the United States
Kixeye games